The 2010 ICC World Cricket League Division Four was a cricket tournament that took place in August 2010 in Italy. It formed part of the World Cricket League competition administered by the International Cricket Council, the international governing body for cricket. The tournament was won by the United States who defeated Italy by 8 wickets in the final.

Teams

Squads

Fixtures

Group stage

Points table

Matches

Playoffs

5th place playoff

3rd place playoff

Final

Final placings

Statistics

References 

2010, 4